Podorythmie is a traditional French Canadian method of tapping one's feet during musical performances, which is a common practice in Québécois and Acadian music.  It is a percussion technique that uses the feet as a musical instrument to produce sound by hitting the feet on the floor.  This technique is especially common during fiddle performances.

Shoes and equipment
In order to produce a sound that is loud enough to be heard over the music, special boards and shoes are employed by the performer. Shoes with wooden heels or leather soles generally have a desirable sound.  Sometimes, the artist will use taps or fibreglass added to the toes and heels to create a louder sound. Contact microphones or specially crafted amplified boards are used in professional stage productions to augment the volume of the foot percussion.

References

Body percussion
French Canadian culture
Percussion performance techniques
Quebec music
Canadian dances
Tap dance
Foot percussion